The Musical Museum is a charity, museum and concert venue located in Brentford, London Borough of Hounslow, a few minutes' walk from Kew Bridge railway station. Its stated purpose is to conserve, preserve, and develop nationally important collections related to the history of music reproduction; inform, engage and entertain the public regarding the evolution of music reproduction; and conserve, preserve, promote and present the theatre pipe organ as an instrument with a significant role in the development of light music on radio and in the cinema and as a musical art form. 

The Musical Museum contains a significant collection of self-playing musical instruments, and one of the world's largest collections of historic musical rolls. The museum houses rare working specimens of player pianos, orchestrions, reed organs, and violin players. The largest exhibits include a fully restored Wurlitzer theatre organ (attached to a roll-playing mechanism and Steinway grand piano) and a 12-rank roll-playing residence pipe organ.

The instruments and exhibits are arranged in three main galleries; the building also houses a concert hall which doubles as a cinema that seats up to 240 people, and a cafe.

Mostly run by volunteers, the museum is open on Fridays, Saturdays, Sundays and Bank Holidays. Guided tours are available, which include live demonstrations of the instruments. The museum also stages regular concerts and events, dances and screenings of both contemporary and silent films, often featuring their Wurlitzer Cinema Organ. Many of their events are broadcast live to their YouTube channel: Musical Museum Live.

History
The Museum was founded in 1963 by Frank Holland MBE (1910–1989) as The British Piano Museum, who believed that self-playing musical instruments should be preserved and played. In 1975, he was interviewed for the TV Show 'Going Places', in which he reminisced about reading an article about there being about eight-hundred abandoned churches in Britain, so he decided to find a suitable one to house the instruments, 'St.George's', Brentford. He later wrote of his experiences in the book 'A Boxful of Rolls'. The Museum moved to a new purpose-built building nearby in 2009.

See also
Wurlitzers in the United Kingdom
 List of music museums

References

External links
Museum website

Brentford, London
Buildings and structures in the London Borough of Hounslow
Museums in the London Borough of Hounslow
Musical instrument museums in England
Music museums in London
Museums established in 1963